Reichartshausen is a municipality in the district of Rhein-Neckar in Baden-Württemberg in Germany. It belongs to the Waibstadt municipal administration association.

References 

Rhein-Neckar-Kreis
Baden